Secondo Martinetto (28 August 1894 – 4 September 1968) was an Italian racing cyclist. He rode in the 1926 Tour de France.

References

External links
 

1894 births
1968 deaths
Italian male cyclists
Place of birth missing
Sportspeople from the Metropolitan City of Turin
Cyclists from Piedmont